This is a list of banks in Oceania

Australia

Central bank
Reserve Bank of Australia

Major banks
ANZ Bank
Commonwealth Bank
Macquarie Bank
National Australia Bank
Westpac
BankSA
Challenge Bank
St George Bank

Foreign banks 

 Citibank Australia
 HSBC Bank Australia

Local banks
Bank of Melbourne
Bank of Queensland
ME Bank
Bankwest
Bendigo & Adelaide Bank
Community Bank
Elders Rural Bank
Suncorp

Defunct banks
State Bank of Victoria
State Bank of New South Wales
Advance Bank
Bank of Melbourne

Fiji

Central bank
Reserve Bank of Fiji

Local banks
Bank of South Pacific
ANZ (Fiji)
HFC (Fiji)
Westpac (Fiji)
Bank of Baroda
BRED Bank (Fiji)

New Zealand

Central bank
Reserve Bank of New Zealand

Local banks
ASB Bank
Bank of New Zealand
Heartland Bank
Kiwibank
SBS Bank
TSB Bank

Foreign banks
ANZ Bank New Zealand
Bank of Baroda
Bank of China
Bank of India
China Construction Bank
Citibank
Commonwealth Bank
Deutsche Bank
Hongkong and Shanghai Banking Corporation
Industrial & Commercial Bank of China
Kookmin Bank
MUFG Bank
Rabobank New Zealand
Westpac New Zealand

Papua New Guinea

Central bank
Bank of Papua New Guinea

Local banks
Bank South Pacific
ANZ Bank Papua New Guinea
Westpac Bank Papua New Guinea
Maybank Papua New Guinea
National Development Bank of Papua New Guinea
Nationwide Micro Bank

Solomon Islands
Bank of South Pacific
Pan Oceanic Bank
ANZ Solomon Islands
National Bank of Solomon Islands
Westpac Solomon Islands
Bank of the South Pacific
Development Bank of Solomon Islands (defunct)

Western Samoa

Central bank
Central Bank of Samoa

Foreign banks
Australia and New Zealand Banking Group Limited (ANZ)

Local banks
Bank South Pacific (BSP)
National Bank of Samoa
Samoa Commercial Bank

Overseas/Offshore Banks

Kingdom of Tonga

Central bank
National Reserve Bank of Tonga

Foreign banks
Australia and New Zealand Banking Group Limited (ANZ)

Local banks
Bank South Pacific (BSP)
MBf Bank
Tonga Development Bank

Defunct banks
Pacific International Commercial Bank

Vanuatu

Central bank
Reserve Bank of Vanuatu

Foreign banks
Australia and New Zealand Banking Group Limited (ANZ)

Local banks
Bank South Pacific (BSP)
National Bank of Vanuatu

Overseas/Offshore Banks